Milwaukee is an unincorporated community and census-designated place (CDP) in Northampton County, North Carolina, United States. It was first listed as a CDP in the 2020 census with a population of 157.

The zipcode is: 27854.

Demographics

2020 census

Note: the US Census treats Hispanic/Latino as an ethnic category. This table excludes Latinos from the racial categories and assigns them to a separate category. Hispanics/Latinos can be of any race.

Notes

Unincorporated communities in Northampton County, North Carolina
Unincorporated communities in North Carolina